James Richard Edmunds Jr. (April 1, 1890 – February 4, 1953) was an American architect.

Biography
He was born on April 1, 1890 in Baltimore, Maryland. He received his education at University of Pennsylvania. He worked with Joseph Evans Sperry and was his partner in 1920.  He was a member of the American Institute of Architects in 1923 and also the Royal Institute of British Architects.  He served as president of the Baltimore Chapter A.I.A. from 1935 to 1936.  He was elected to the A.I.A. College of Fellows in 1937.  From 1945 to 1947 he served as national A.I.A. president.  Edmunds was a consultant to the American Hospital Association, the U.S. Surgeon General, the National Institute of Health, and Children's Rehabilitation Institute. One of Edmund's significant works was the art deco Hutzler's Tower Building at 234 North Howard Street, in Baltimore.

He died on February 4, 1953.

References

Further reading
Alumni Association. General alumni catalogue of the University of Pennsylvania, 1922 Philadelphia, Publisher: Alumni Association, 1922. 
AIA Baltimore A Chapter History from 1870–2005, Charles Belfoure, pg. 93
The Architecture of Baltimore: An Illustrated History by Frank R. Shivers Jr., Mary Ellen Hayward, pg. 263-264

External links
 Baltimore Architecture Foundation
 Baltimore Dead Architects Society
 Biography of James Bosley Noel Wyatt

20th-century American architects
Architects from Baltimore
1890 births
1953 deaths
University of Pennsylvania alumni
Fellows of the American Institute of Architects
Presidents of the American Institute of Architects